

In Sri Lankan folklore, the Devil Bird or Ulama is a creature said to emit bloodcurdling human-sounding shrieks in jungles at night. It is believed that the cry of this bird is an omen that portends death. Its precise identity is still a matter of debate although the spot-bellied eagle-owl matches the profile of Devil Bird to a large extent, according to a finding in 2001. Other possible identities include the forest eagle-owl (Bubo nipalensis),  the crested honey-buzzard (Pernis ptilorhynchus ruficollis), and various eagles. As the bird is not usually seen and its cry only described in vague terms, Ulama records might also refer to the Ceylon highland nightjar (Caprimulgus indicus kelaarti).

See also 
Banshee, a similar omen in Irish mythology
Hakawai, a similar omen in Māori mythology

References 

Legendary birds
Sri Lankan legendary creatures